An obituary (obit for short) is an article about a recently deceased person.  Newspapers often publish obituaries as news articles. Although obituaries tend to focus on positive aspects of the subject's life, this is not always the case. According to Nigel Farndale, the Obituaries Editor of The Times: "Obits should be life affirming rather than gloomy, but they should also be opinionated, leaving the reader with a strong sense of whether the subject lived a good life or bad; whether they were right or wrong in the handling of their public affairs."

In local newspapers, an obituary may be published for any local resident upon death. A necrology is a register or list of records of the deaths of people related to a particular organization, group or field, which may only contain the sparsest details, or small obituaries.  Historical necrologies can be important sources of information.

Two types of paid advertisements are related to obituaries.  One, known as a death notice, usually appears in the Births, Marriages and Deaths (BMD) section of a paper and omits most biographical details and may be a legally required public notice under some circumstances.  The other type, a paid memorial advertisement, is usually written by family members or friends, perhaps with assistance from a funeral home. Both types of paid advertisements are usually run as classified advertisements.

The word also applies to the entire program and the part of that program describing the life of the deceased. It is given to those who attend their service. The verso page heading may be Obituary or Reflections, the recto heading is usually Order of Service.

Premature obituaries 

A premature obituary is a false reporting of the death of a person who is still alive. It may occur due to unexpected survival of someone who was close to death. Other reasons for such publication might be miscommunication between newspapers, family members, and the funeral home, often resulting in embarrassment for everyone involved.  

In November 2020, Radio France Internationale accidentally published about 100 prewritten obituaries for celebrities such as Queen Elizabeth II and Clint Eastwood.  The premature publication was blamed on a transition to a new content management system.

Irish author Brendan Behan said, "there is no such thing as bad publicity except your own obituary." In this regard, some people seek to have an unsuspecting newspaper editor publish a premature death notice or obituary as a malicious hoax, perhaps to gain revenge on the "deceased". To that end, nearly all newspapers now have policies requiring that death notices come from a reliable source (such as a funeral home), though even this has not stopped some pranksters such as Alan Abel.

Prewritten obituaries
Many news organizations maintain prewritten (or preedited video) obituaries on file for notable individuals who are still living, in order to promptly publish detailed, authoritative, and lengthy obituaries upon their deaths. These are also known as "advance" obituaries. The Los Angeles Times obituary of Elizabeth Taylor, for example, was written in 1999 after three months of research, then often updated before the actress' 2011 death. Sometimes the prewritten obituary's subject outlives its author. One example is The New York Times''' obituary of Taylor, written by the newspaper's theater critic Mel Gussow, who died in 2005. 

Writing in 2021, Paul Farhi of The Washington Post observed that while once a "sleepy corner of journalism", publications in the Internet age have invested more resources in preparing advance obituaries for rapid publication online, in order to meet widespread public interest; obituaries can attract millions of readers online within days of their subjects' deaths. The New York Times maintains a "deep reservoir" of advance obituaries, estimated to stand at roughly 1,850 . The paper often interviews notables specifically for their obituaries, a practice begun by Alden Whitman in 1966. , The Washington Post has about 900 advance obituaries on file, and entertainment publication The Hollywood Reporter has prepared 800 advances for notable figures in the film and television industry.

Former New York Times obituary writer Margalit Fox wrote that "as a general rule, when lives are long enough, accomplished enough and complex enough that we would just as soon not get caught short writing them on deadline, advances are assigned". However, Farhi noted that obituaries of younger people may still be written in advance if they are known to have health problems or "chaotic lives"; The Washington Post had an advance obituary for singer Amy Winehouse, whose struggles with substance abuse were widely chronicled before her death at age 27. Still, many public figures who die unexpectedly or prematurely will have no advance obituary available at a given publication, and journalists will be left to research and write lengthy profiles on short notice.

 Media 

Obituaries are a notable feature of The Economist, which publishes one full-page obituary per week, reflecting on the subject's life and influence on world history. Past subjects have ranged from Ray Charles to Uday Hussein to George Floyd.The Times and the Daily Telegraph publish anthologies of obituaries under a common theme, such as military obituaries, sports obituaries, heroes and adventurers, entertainers, rogues, eccentric lives, etc.

The British Medical Journal encourages doctors to write their own obituaries for publication after their death.

For numerous summer seasons, CBC Radio One has run The Late Show'', a radio documentary series which presents extended obituaries of interesting Canadians.

See also 
 Death
 Eulogy
 Funeral
 Gedenkschrift
 Lists of deaths by year
 Lists of people by cause of death
 He never married

References

Further reading

External links 

   

Acknowledgements of death
Funeral-related industry
Periodical articles